Indie Cindy is the fifth studio album by the American alternative rock band the Pixies. Released in April 2014, it was the band's first album since 1991's Trompe le Monde, and the first Pixies album not to feature bass guitar player Kim Deal. Instead, bass guitar duties on the album are handled by Simon "Dingo" Archer, a former member of the British post-punk band The Fall.

The album combines all the songs from the band's 2013–14 extended play releases—EP1, EP2, and EP3—which were recorded and produced in 2012 by Gil Norton, who produced the band's previous albums Doolittle, Bossanova, and Trompe le Monde.

Limited numbers of vinyl copies of the album were released on Record Store Day 2014 (double album but pressed at 45 rpm), 10 days prior to the album's full release. These copies came with a single-sided 7" single of "Women of War". The album was released in North America on April 29, 2014 as a digital download, digipak CD and 2LP vinyl as well as a deluxe edition on CD or vinyl which included a live CD and a 40-page hardback book.

Commercial performance
The album peaked at number 23 on the US Billboard 200, making it the band's most successful album on that chart. In 2016 it was awarded a gold certification from the Independent Music Companies Association which indicated sales of at least 75,000 copies throughout Europe. As of 2015, sales in the United States have exceeded 34,000 copies, according to Nielsen SoundScan.

Critical reception 

At Metacritic, which assigns a weighted mean rating out of 100 to reviews from mainstream critics, Indie Cindy received an average score of 62 based on 32 reviews, which indicates "generally favorable reviews".

Track listing 
All songs written by Black Francis, except where noted.

Personnel 
Pixies
 Black Francis – vocals, guitar, backing vocals on "Bagboy"
 Paz Lenchantin – bass guitar and backing vocals on deluxe edition<ref>{{Cite web |url=http://www.pixiesmusic.com/2014/03/indie-cindy-new-album/ |title=pixieMusic – ''track listing for 'Live In The USA 2014-March-24th |access-date=2014-03-24 |archive-url=https://web.archive.org/web/20140418102056/http://www.pixiesmusic.com/2014/03/indie-cindy-new-album/ |archive-date=2014-04-18 |url-status=dead }}</ref> tracks and "Women of War"
 David Lovering – drums, backing vocals on "Women of War" and "Bagboy"
 Joey Santiago – lead guitarAdditional musiciansDing (Simon "Dingo" Archer) – bass guitar
Jeremy Dubs – backing vocalsTechnical personnel'''
Gil Norton – production, engineering, mixing
Justin Pizzoferrato – additional engineering (Sonelab])
Mike Stitsinger – additional engineering (The Autumn Den)
Dan Austin – mixing
Miles Wilson – mixing (live tracks)
Vaughan Oliver – art direction, design
Michael Speed – design assistance, xp illustration
Ian Pollock – character illustration

Charts

Weekly charts

Year-end charts

Release history

References 

2014 albums
Albums produced by Gil Norton
Pixies (band) albums
PIAS Recordings albums
Record Store Day releases
Albums recorded at Rockfield Studios